Coverdale is an unincorporated community in Jefferson Davis and Allen parishes in the U.S state of Louisiana.

Notes

Unincorporated communities in Allen Parish, Louisiana
Unincorporated communities in Jefferson Davis Parish, Louisiana
Unincorporated communities in Louisiana